Indigenous peoples of the Southeastern Woodlands, Southeastern cultures, or Southeast Indians are an ethnographic classification for Native Americans who have traditionally inhabited the area now part of the Southeastern United States and the northeastern border of Mexico, that share common cultural traits. This classification is a part of the Eastern Woodlands. The concept of a southeastern cultural region was developed by anthropologists, beginning with Otis Mason and Franz Boas in 1887. The boundaries of the region are defined more by shared cultural traits than by geographic distinctions. Because the cultures gradually instead of abruptly shift into Plains, Prairie, or Northeastern Woodlands cultures, scholars do not always agree on the exact limits of the Southeastern Woodland culture region. Shawnee, Powhatan, Waco, Tawakoni, Tonkawa, Karankawa, Quapaw, and Mosopelea are usually seen as marginally southeastern and their traditional lands represent the borders of the cultural region.

The area was linguistically diverse, major language groups were Caddoan and Muskogean, besides a number of language isolates.

List of peoples 

Acolapissa (Colapissa), Louisiana and Mississippi
Ais, eastern coastal Florida
Alafay (Alafia, Pojoy, Pohoy, Costas Alafeyes, Alafaya Costas), Florida
Amacano, Florida west coast
Apalachee, northwestern Florida
Atakapa (Attacapa), Louisiana west coast and Texas southeastern coast
Akokisa, Texas southeast coast
Bidai, Texas southeast coast
Deadose, eastern Texas
Eastern Atakapa, western coastal Louisiana
Orcoquiza, southeast Texas
Patiri, eastern Texas
Tlacopsel, southeast Texas
Avoyel ("little Natchez"), Louisiana
Bayogoula, southeastern Louisiana
Biloxi, Mississippi
Caddo Confederacy, Arkansas, Louisiana, Oklahoma, Texas
Adai (Adaizan, Adaizi, Adaise, Adahi, Adaes, Adees, Atayos), Louisiana and Texas
Cahinnio, southern Arkansas
Doustioni, north central Louisiana
Eyeish (Hais), eastern Texas
Hainai, eastern Texas
Hasinai, eastern Texas
Kadohadacho, northeastern Texas, southwestern Arkansas, northwestern Louisiana
Nabedache, eastern Texas
Nabiti, eastern Texas
Nacogdoche, eastern Texas
Nacono, eastern Texas
Nadaco, eastern Texas
Nanatsoho, northeastern Texas
Nasoni, eastern Texas
Natchitoches, Lower: central Louisiana, Upper: northeastern Texas
Neche, eastern Texas
Nechaui, eastern Texas
Ouachita, northern Louisiana
Tula, western Arkansas
Yatasi, northwestern Louisiana
Calusa, southwestern Florida
Cape Fear Indians, North Carolina southern coast
Catawba (Esaw, Usheree, Ushery, Yssa), North Carolina, South Carolina
Chakchiuma, Alabama and Mississippi
Chatot people (Chacato, Chactoo), west Florida
Chawasha (Washa), Louisiana
Cheraw (Chara, Charàh), North Carolina
Cherokee, western North Carolina, eastern Tennessee, later Georgia, northwestern South Carolina, northern Alabama, Arkansas, Texas, Mexico, and currently North Carolina and Oklahoma
Chickamauga, eastern Tennessee 
Chickanee (Chiquini), North Carolina
 Chickasaw, Alabama and Mississippi, now Oklahoma
Chicora, coastal South Carolina
Chine, Florida
Chisca (Cisca), southwestern Virginia, northern Florida
Chitimacha, Louisiana
Choctaw, Mississippi, Alabama, and parts of Louisiana; later Oklahoma
Chowanoc (Chowanoke), North Carolina
Congaree (Canggaree), South Carolina
Coree, North Carolina
Croatan, North Carolina
Cusabo coastal South Carolina
Eno, North Carolina
Etiwan, South Carolina
Grigra (Gris), Mississippi
Guacata (Santalûces), eastern coastal Florida
Guacozo, Florida
Guale (Cusabo, Iguaja, Ybaja), coastal Georgia
Guazoco, southwestern Florida coast
Houma, Louisiana and Mississippi
Jaega (Jobe), eastern coastal Florida
Jaupin (Weapemoc), North Carolina
Jororo, Florida interior
Keyauwee, North Carolina
Koasati (Coushatta), formerly eastern Tennessee, currently Louisiana, Oklahoma, and Texas
Koroa, Mississippi
Luca, southwestern Florida coast
Lumbee, North Carolina
Machapunga, North Carolina
Matecumbe (Matacumbêses, Matacumbe, Matacombe), Florida Keys
Mayaca, Florida
Mayaimi (Mayami), interior Florida
Mayajuaca, Florida
Mikasuki (Miccosukee), Florida
Mobila (Mobile, Movila), northwestern Florida and southern Alabama
Mocoso, western Florida
Mougoulacha, Mississippi
Muscogee, Tennessee, Georgia, Alabama, Mississippi, Florida, later Oklahoma
Abihka, Alabama, later Oklahoma
Alabama, formerly Alabama, southwestern Tennessee, and northwestern Mississippi, now Oklahoma and Texas
Pakana (Pacâni, Pagna, Pasquenan, Pak-ká-na, Pacanas), central Alabama, later Texas
 Apalachicola Province, (Lower Towns of the Muscogee (Creek) Confederacy), Alabama and Georgia
 Apalachicola (town), Alabama, Georgia and South Carolina
 Hitchiti, Alabama and Georgia
 Oconi, Alabama and Georgia
 Sabacola (Sawakola, Sabacôla, Savacola, Sawokli), Alabama and Georgia
Chiaha, Creek Confederacy, Alabama
Eufaula tribe, Georgia, later Oklahoma
Kialegee Tribal Town, Alabama, later Oklahoma
Osochee (Osochi, Oswichee, Usachi, Oosécha), Creek Confederacy, Alabama
Talapoosa, Creek Confederacy, Alabama
Thlopthlocco Tribal Town, Alabama, Georgia, later Oklahoma
Tukabatchee, Muscogee Creek Confederacy, Alabama
Naniaba, northwestern Florida and southern Alabama
Natchez, Louisiana and Mississippi later Oklahoma
Neusiok (Newasiwac, Neuse River Indians), North Carolina
Norwood culture, Apalachee region, Florida, c. 12,000 BCE — 4500 BCE
Ofo (Mosopelea), Arkansas and Mississippi, eastern Tennessee
Okchai (Ogchay), central Alabama
Okelousa, Louisiana
Opelousas, Louisiana
Pacara people, Florida
Pamlico, formerly North Carolina
Pascagoula, Mississippi coast
Pee Dee (Pedee), South Carolina and North Carolina
Pensacola, Florida panhandle and southern Alabama
Potoskeet, North Carolina
Quinipissa, southeastern Louisiana and Mississippi
Roanoke, North Carolina
Saluda (Saludee, Saruti), South Carolina
Santee (Seretee, Sarati, Sati, Sattees), South Carolina (no relation to Santee Sioux), South Carolina
Santa Luces, Florida
Saponi, North Carolina, Virginia
Saura, North Carolina
Saxapahaw (Sissipahua, Shacioes), North Carolina
Secotan, North Carolina
Seminole, Florida and Oklahoma
Sewee (Suye, Joye, Xoye, Soya), South Carolina coast
Shakori, North Carolina
Shoccoree (Haw), North Carolina, possibly Virginia
Sissipahaw, North Carolina
Sugeree (Sagarees, Sugaws, Sugar, Succa), North Carolina and South Carolina
Surruque, east central Florida
Suteree (Sitteree,  Sutarees, Sataree), North Carolina
Taensa, Mississippi
Tawasa, Alabama
Tequesta, southeastern coastal Florida
Timucua, Florida and Georgia
Acuera, central Florida
Agua Fresca (or Agua Dulce or Freshwater), interior northeast Florida
Arapaha, north central Florida and south central Georgia?
Cascangue, coastal southeast Georgia
Icafui (or Icafi), coastal southeast Georgia
Mocama, coastal northeast Florida and coastal southeast Georgia
Saturiwa, northeast Florida
Tacatacuru, coastal southeast Georgia
Northern Utina north central Florida
Ocale, central Florida
Oconi, interior southeast Georgia
Potano, north central Florida
Tucururu (or Tucuru), central? Florida
Utina (or Eastern Utina), northeast central Florida
Yufera, coastal southeast Georgia
Yui (Ibi), coastal southeast Georgia
Yustaga, north central Florida
Tiou (Tioux), Mississippi
Tocaste, Florida
Tocobaga, Florida
Tohomé, northwestern Florida and southern Alabama
Tomahitan, eastern Tennessee
Topachula,  Florida
Tunica, Arkansas and Mississippi
Utiza, Florida
Uzita, Tampa Bay, Florida
Vicela, Florida
Viscaynos, Florida
Waccamaw, South Carolina
Waccamaw Siouan, North Carolina
Wateree (Guatari, Watterees), North Carolina
Waxhaw (Waxsaws, Wisack, Wisacky, Weesock, Flathead), North Carolina and South Carolina
Westo, Virginia and South Carolina, extinct
Winyaw, South Carolina coast
Woccon, North Carolina
Yamasee, Florida, Georgia
Yazoo, southeastern tip of Arkansas, eastern Louisiana, Mississippi
Yuchi (Euchee), central Tennessee, then northwest Georgia, now Oklahoma

Federally recognized tribes 

 Alabama-Coushatta Tribes of Texas
 Alabama-Quassarte Tribal Town, Oklahoma
 Caddo Nation of Oklahoma
 Catawba Indian Nation, South Carolina
 Cherokee Nation, Oklahoma
 Chickasaw Nation, Oklahoma
 Chitimacha Tribe of Louisiana
 Choctaw Nation of Oklahoma
 Coushatta Tribe of Louisiana
 Eastern Band of Cherokee Indians of North Carolina
 Jena Band of Choctaw Indians, Louisiana
 Kialegee Tribal Town, Oklahoma
 Miccosukee Tribe of Indians of Florida
 Mississippi Band of Choctaw Indians, Mississippi
 Muscogee (Creek) Nation, Oklahoma
 Poarch Band of Creek Indians of Alabama
 Seminole Tribe of Florida
 Seminole Nation of Oklahoma
 Thlopthlocco Tribal Town, Oklahoma
 Tunica-Biloxi Indian Tribe of Louisiana
 United Keetoowah Band of Cherokee Indians in Oklahoma

History
The following section deals primarily with the history of the peoples in the lengthy period before European contact. Evidence of the preceding cultures have been found primarily in archeological artifacts, but also in major earthworks and the evidence of linguistics. In the Late Prehistoric time period in the Southeastern Woodlands, cultures increased agricultural production, developed ranked societies, increased their populations, trade networks, and intertribal warfare. Most Southeastern peoples (excepting some of the coastal peoples) were highly agricultural, growing crops like maize, squash, and beans for food. They supplemented their diet with hunting, fishing, and gathering wild plants and fungi.

Belonging in the Lithic stage, the oldest known art in the Americas is the Vero Beach bone found in present-day Florida. It is possibly a mammoth bone, etched with a profile of walking mammoth; it dates to 11,000 BCE.

Poverty Point culture
The Poverty Point culture inhabited portions of the state of Louisiana from 2000–1000 BCE during the Archaic period. Many objects excavated at Poverty Point sites were made of materials that originated in distant places, indicating that the people were part of an extensive trading culture. Such items include chipped stone projectile points and tools; ground stone plummets, gorgets and vessels; and shell and stone beads. Stone tools found at Poverty Point were made from raw materials that can be traced to the relatively nearby Ouachita and Ozark mountains, as well as others from the more distant Ohio and Tennessee River valleys. Vessels were made from soapstone which came from the Appalachian foothills of Alabama and Georgia. Hand-modeled lowly fired clay objects occur in a variety of shapes including anthropomorphic figurines and cooking balls.

Mississippian culture
Mississippian cultures flourished in what is now the Midwestern, Eastern, and Southeastern United States from approximately 800 CE to 1500 CE, varying regionally. After adopting maize agriculture the Mississippian culture became fully agrarian, as opposed to the preceding Woodland cultures that supplemented hunting and gathering with limited horticulture. Mississippian peoples often built platform mounds. They refined their ceramic techniques and often used ground mussel shell as a tempering agent. Many were involved with the Southeastern Ceremonial Complex, a multi-regional and multi-linguistic religious and trade network that marked the southeastern part of the Mississippian Ideological Interaction Sphere. Information about Southeastern Ceremonial Complex primary comes from archaeology and the study of the elaborate artworks left behind by its participants, including elaborate pottery, conch shell gorgets and cups, stone statuary, and Long-nosed god maskettes. The Calusa peoples, of southern Florida, carved and painted wood in exquisite depictions of animals.

By the time of European contact the Mississippian societies were already experiencing severe social stress. Some major centers had already been abandoned. With social upsets and diseases unknowingly introduced by Europeans many of the societies collapsed and ceased to practice a Mississippian lifestyle, with an exception being the Natchez people of Mississippi and Louisiana. Other tribes descended from Mississippian cultures include the Alabama, Biloxi, Caddo, Choctaw, Muscogee Creek, Tunica, and many other southeastern peoples.

Post-European contact

During the Indian Removal era of the 1830s, most southeastern tribes were forcibly relocated to Indian Territory west of the Mississippi River by the US federal government, as European-American settlers pushed the government to acquire their lands. Some members of the tribes chose to stay in their homelands and accept state and US citizenship; others simply hid in the mountains or swamps and sought to maintain some cultural continuity. Since the late 20th century, descendants of these people have organized as tribes; in a limited number of cases, some have achieved federal recognition but more have gained state recognition through legislation at the state level.

Culture

Frank Speck identified several key cultural traits of Southeastern Woodlands peoples. Social traits included having a matrilineal kinship system, exogamous marriage between clans, and organizing into settled villages and towns. Southeastern Woodlands societies were usually divided into clans; the most common from pre-contact Hopewellian times into the present include Bear, Beaver, Bird other than a raptor, Canine (e.g. Wolf), Elk, Feline (e.g. Panther), Fox, Raccoon, and Raptor. They observe strict incest taboos, including taboos against marriage within a clan. In the past, they frequently allowed polygamy to chiefs and other men who could support multiple wives. They held puberty rites for both boys and girls.

Southeastern peoples also traditionally shared similar religious beliefs, based on animism. They used fish poison, and practiced purification ceremonies among their religious rituals, as well as the Green Corn Ceremony. Medicine people are important spiritual healers.

Many southeastern peoples engaged in mound building to create sacred or acknowledged ritual sites. Many of the religious beliefs of the Southeastern Ceremonial Complex or the Southern Cult, were also shared by the Northeastern Woodlands tribes, probably spread through the dominance of the Mississippian culture in the 10th century.

The main agricultural crops of the region were the Three Sisters : winter squash, maize (corn), and climbing beans (usually tepary beans or common beans). Originating in Mesoamerica, these three crops were carried northward over centuries to many parts of North America. The three crops were normally planted together using a technique known as companion planting on flat-topped mounds of soil. The three crops were planted in this way as each benefits from the proximity of the others. The tall maize plants provide a structure for the beans to climb, while the beans provide nitrogen to the soil that benefits the other plants. Meanwhile, the squash spreads along the ground, blocking the sunlight to prevent weeds from growing and retaining moisture in the soil.

See also 

Classification of indigenous peoples of the Americas
Indigenous people of the Everglades region
Northeastern Woodlands tribes
Stomp dance
Trail of Tears

Notes

References
Carr, Christopher and D. Troy Case. Gathering Hopewell: Society, Ritual, and Ritual Interaction. New York: Springer, 2006. .
Hann, John H. "The Mayaca and Jororo and Missions to Them", in McEwan, Bonnie G. ed. The Spanish Missions of "La Florida". Gainesville, Florida: University Press of Florida. 1993. .
Hann, John H. A History of the Timucua Indians and Missions. Gainesville, Florida: University Press of Florida, 1996. .
Hann, John H. (2003). Indians of Central and South Florida: 1513-1763. University Press of Florida. 
 Jackson, Jason Baird and Raymond D. Fogelson. "Introduction." Sturtevant, William C., general editor and Raymond D. Fogelson, volume editor. Handbook of North American Indians: Southeast. Volume 14. Washington DC: Smithsonian Institution, 2004: 1-68. .
 Pritzker, Barry M. A Native American Encyclopedia: History, Culture, and Peoples. Oxford: Oxford University Press, 2000. .
 Sturtevant, William C., general editor and Raymond D. Fogelson, volume editor. Handbook of North American Indians: Southeast. Volume 14. Washington DC: Smithsonian Institution, 2004. .
Roark, Elisabeth Louise. Artists of Colonial America. Westport, CT: Greenwood, 2003. .

External links
US Federally recognized tribes of the Southeast 

 
Mississippian culture
Eastern Woodlands
Indigenous peoples in Mexico
Indigenous peoples in the United States
Native American tribes
Southeastern United States
Southeastern Woodlands